Oserick Bernard "Ossie" Nicholson (1910 – 9 November 1965) was an Australian cyclist who twice held the World Endurance record for distance in a calendar year.

Australian cycling career 
Nicholson was a professional cyclist in the years before World War II. He competed on both road and track, as was typical of Australian cyclists of the era such as Hubert Opperman and Richard Lamb.

Nicholson was third in the 1929 Warrnambool to Melbourne Classic, behind Opperman and Horrie Marshall and won the 1929 Wangaratta to Melbourne race. In February 1930 Nicholson rode  to break the Australian one hour motor-paced cycling record, previously held by Opperman. The following week Opperman narrowly defeated Nicholson in a  motor-paced match race. A week later Nicholson set the fastest time in the Tour of Gippsland.

In 1934 Nicholson was training Billie Samuel to break records. In the same year he was suspended for six months for interfering with E Waterford who was making a record attempt from Adelaide to Melbourne. The suspension was extended to 12 months as Nicholson unsuccessfully appealed. Nicholson was able to have the suspension lifted in time to ride in the Centenary 1000. The Centenary 1000 was a one-week race over seven stages covering . The race was run in as part of the celebrations of the Centenary of Victoria. In stage 2 there was a crash at a railway crossing a few miles from Penshurst involving Nicholson, Joe Buckley and Bill Brewer. Nicholson suffered a severe head injury, completing the stage despite suffering from concussion, but abandoning the race at Stawell.

In 1938 Nicholsen set the Australian men's seven day record, riding .

1931 Tour de France 
Nicholson rode in the 1931 Tour de France in a combined Australia/Switzerland team including Opperman, Lamb and Frankie Thomas. In the third stage Nicholson's crank broke. The 18 km walk for a new crank meant Nicholson finished outside the time limit and was eliminated.

World endurance record for distance cycled in a single year 
In 1911 the weekly magazine Cycling began a competition for the highest number of 100 mile rides or "centuries" in a single year. The winner was Marcel Planes with 332 centuries in which he covered . A.R. Peebles of England had the highest number of consecutive centuries with 268.

Malvern Star was a sponsor of Nicholson, so when he agreed to undertake the record attempt in 1933 with Bruce Small as his manager and promoter, Malvern Star supplied the bicycle with the latest equipment, the first derailleur to be available in Australia, a 3-speed made by the Cyclo Gear Company. Nicholson was a tyre tester for Dunlop Rubber who supplied his tyres. In 1937 the League of Victorian Wheelmen declined a request by Nicholson for patronage for his attempt on the record. Nicholson's response was to appoint a committee to supervise his attempt. He predominantly rode from Melbourne to Portsea. A car collided with Nicholson on 12 December 1933, but despite a trip to hospital Nicholson was able to continue his rides without interruption.

It appears that Nicholson's record was unmatched until 2017.

For his efforts, Nicholson received £25 from Cyclo and a gold watch from Dunlop. Nicholson is reported to have received an unspecified honorarium from an unnamed "English sportsman" for the period he held the record.

On New Year's Day 1937, Nicholson rode off on the difficult journey to wrest back the record. Bernard Bennett and René Menzies were also attempting to break the record. Nicholson developed a lead however Menzies had drawn level in October 1937, as both passed Greaves' distance. Each of the three riders beat Greaves' mark with Bennett riding  and Menzies riding .

He died in November 1965 in Auckland, New Zealand from a heart attack.

Notes

References

External links

 Official Tour de France results for Ossie Nicholson

1910 births
1965 deaths
Australian male cyclists
Cyclists from Melbourne
Ultra-distance cyclists